Yatina is a town and locality in the Australian state of South Australia located on the RM Williams Way about  north of the state capital of Adelaide and about  and  respectively from the municipal seats of Jamestown and Orroroo.

Yatina was proclaimed as a town in July 1874 and the first town lots were sold in September that year. The Yatina Hotel was also built that same year. Early hopes for the new town were disappointed in 1877 when a promised railway extension bypassed the town. In 1886, Yatina's population was 80, with an estimate of 100 residents the next year. Boundaries for the locality were created on 16 December 1999 that include the site of the Government Town of Yatina. The portion within the Northern Areas Council, being the southern side of locality, was added on 12 April 2001. Part of Yatina on its western side was 'excluded' and added to the adjoining locality of Tarcowie on 2 August 2012 following a request from residents. The name derives from the Aboriginal name of a nearby black rock.

Land use within the locality is ’primary production’ and is concerned with “agricultural production and the grazing of stock on relatively large holdings.”

The 2016 Australian census which was conducted in August 2016 reports that Yatina had a population of 29.

Yatina is located within the federal division of Grey, the state electoral district of Stuart, and the local government areas of the District Council of Orroroo Carrieton and the Northern Areas Council.

References

Towns in South Australia